Robert Joseph Scholtz (born December 25, 1937) is a former American football offensive lineman. He was selected in the third round (27th overall) by the Detroit Lions in the 1960 NFL Draft after playing college football for Notre Dame. He played seven seasons for the Lions, New York Giants, and New Orleans Saints in the NFL.

References
 Profile at pro-football-reference.com

1937 births
Living people
People from Watertown, South Dakota
Players of American football from South Dakota
American football centers
American football offensive tackles
American football offensive guards
Detroit Lions players
New York Giants players
Notre Dame Fighting Irish football players
New Orleans Saints players